Alpha Centauri (or α Cen) is a star system and the collective name of three stars in that system. The individual stars are named Alpha Centauri A, Alpha Centauri B, and Proxima Centauri.

It may also refer to:

 Alpha Centauri (Doctor Who), an alien in Doctor Who
 Sid Meier's Alpha Centauri, a 1999 strategy computer game
 Alpha Centauri (album), an album by Tangerine Dream
 "Alpha Centauri", a song featured on the album In/Casino/Out by At the Drive-In
 The Alpha Centaurids, a meteor shower
 Alpha Centauri (horse) (foaled 2015), Irish-trained thoroughbred racehorse

See also

 A Centauri (disambiguation)
 Alpha Centauri b (disambiguation)
 Alpha Centauri in fiction
 
 Centauri (disambiguation)
 Alpha (disambiguation)